Tingena thalerodes is a species of moth in the family Oecophoridae. It is endemic to New Zealand and has been found at Arthur's Pass. This species inhabits rough herbage on mountain sides. Adults are on the wing in December and January.

Taxonomy 
This species was first described by Edward Meyrick in 1916 using a specimen collected at Arthur's Pass in December by George Hudson and named Borkhausenia thalerodes. George Hudson discussed and illustrated this species under the name Borkhausenia thalerodes in his 1928 publication The butterflies and moths of New Zealand. Philpott discussed this species under the name B. thalerodes  however he was unable to find a specimen for dissection in order to study the male genitalia. In 1988 J. S. Dugdale placed this species within the genus Tingena. The male holotype, collected at Arthur's Pass, is held in at the Natural History Museum, London.

Description  

Meyrick described this species as follows:

Distribution 
This species is endemic to New Zealand.

Behaviour 
The adults of this species are on the wing in December and January.

Habitat 
T. thalerodes inhabits rough herbage on mountain sides.

References

Oecophoridae
Moths of New Zealand
Moths described in 1916
Endemic fauna of New Zealand
Taxa named by Edward Meyrick
Endemic moths of New Zealand